The finals of the 1982 NCAA Division I softball tournament were held from May 27 through May 30. 16 Division I college softball teams met in the NCAA tournament's first round at campus sites.  After having played their way through the regular season and first round (and for Oklahoma State, a conference tournament, an AIAW regional title and double losses to Texas A&M in the AIAW Women's College World Series final on May 25), the eight advancing teams played in the NCAA Women's College World Series in Omaha, Nebraska.  UCLA won the title. Historian Bill Plummer III wrote, "With their 77-8 season record, Texas A&M could have been a contender in Omaha − maybe even the top seed − against perennial softball powers like UCLA and Fresno State. The Aggies had been invited to the NCAA's first national tournament, but chose not to go. A&M coach Bob Brock had high respect for the eleven-year-old AIAW, even as the NCAA began to overshadow it. Out of a sense of loyalty to the AIAW, Brock said, his school chose the 1982 Norman championship over the NCAA's first in Omaha."

Regionals

Western Michigan qualifies for WCWS, 2–1

Cal State Fullerton qualifies for WCWS, 2–0.

Creighton qualifies for WCWS, 2–0.

Nebraska qualifies for WCWS, 2–1.

Oklahoma State qualifies for WCWS, 2–0.

UCLA qualifies for WCWS, 2–0.

Arizona State qualifies for WCWS, 2–1.

Fresno State qualifies for WCWS, 2–1.

Women's College World Series

Participants
These eight teams met at Seymour Smith Park to decide the 1982 NCAA Division I Softball Championship:

UCLA

Bracket

Championship Game

See also

References

1982 NCAA Division I softball season
NCAA Division I softball tournament